In The Shadows is a BBC Audiobooks original audiobook written by Joseph Lidster and based on the British science fiction television, Doctor Who spin-off series Torchwood. The story is set during and after the second series of the show and was released in March 2009.

Plot introduction
A man has died of old age in his 30s. This, among other strange events, has led Torchwood to conclude that someone is sending victims to another dimension, one in which they are punished by the thing which they fear the most. Who is the mysterious taxi driver preying on his passengers?

Audiobooks based on Torchwood